Clairette rose is a grape variety that is listed among the  accessory varieties in the Côtes du Rhône AOC and  Côtes du Rhône-Villages AOC.
Clairette rose is the pink mutation of Clairette B. It has no officially recognized synonyms  in  the European Union.

References 

wine